Pueblo Pintado is a census-designated place (CDP) in McKinley County, New Mexico, United States. The population was 247 at the 2000 census.

Geography
According to the United States Census Bureau, the CDP has a total area of 10.5 square miles (27.2 km), all land.

Demographics

At the 2000 census there were 247 people in 72 households, including 52 families, in the CDP. The population density was 23.5 people per square mile (9.1/km). There were 106 housing units at an average density of 10.1 per square mile (3.9/km).  The racial makeup of the CDP was 90.69% Native American, 9.31% White and Hispanic or Latino of any race were 0.40%.

Of the 72 households 34.7% had children under the age of 18 living with them, 40.3% were married couples living together, 27.8% had a female householder with no husband present, and 26.4% were non-families. 25.0% of households were one person and 2.8% were one person aged 65 or older. The average household size was 3.43 and the average family size was 4.25.

The age distribution was 41.3% under the age of 18, 7.7% from 18 to 24, 25.9% from 25 to 44, 16.6% from 45 to 64, and 8.5% 65 or older. The median age was 26 years. For every 100 females, there were 87.1 males. For every 100 females age 18 and over, there were 83.5 males.

The median household income was $14,583 and the median family income was $18,750. Males had a median income of $0 versus $0 for females. The per capita income for the CDP was $7,760. About 50.0% of families and 64.3% of the population were below the poverty line, including 89.5% of those under the age of eighteen and 66.7% of those sixty five or over.

Pueblo Pintado Great House
The ruins of an Ancestral Puebloan Great House stand in the area, 16 miles east of Pueblo Bonito, as part of the Chaco Canyon area. The name Pueblo Pintado is Spanish for "painted village", named by a guide during an 1849 expedition. The great house is estimated to have had 90 rooms, 14 to 16 kivas, and there is a great kiva to the south with an interior diameter of 58 feet. Tree ring dating, (dendrochronology) puts the construction of Pueblo Pintado at 1060-1061 AD, during the height of the Chacoan construction period.

Education
Pueblo Pintado Community School, a K-8 school, is operated by the Bureau of Indian Education (BIE).

The community is within the Gallup-McKinley County Public Schools. Tseʼ Yiʼ Gai High School is near the CDP. Zoned schools are: Crownpoint Elementary School in Crownpoint, Crownpoint Middle School in Crownpoint, and Tseʼ Yiʼ Gai High School.

See also
 List of census-designated places in New Mexico

References

External links

 Pueblo Pintado, a Photo Gallery

Census-designated places in McKinley County, New Mexico
Census-designated places in New Mexico
Pueblo great houses
Pueblos in New Mexico